Flora Vere O'Brien (19 September 1896 – 1970) was an Irish writer. Her work was part of the literature event in the art competition at the 1948 Summer Olympics.

References

1896 births
1970 deaths
20th-century Irish women writers
Olympic competitors in art competitions
People from London